Naeko Maeda (born 12 July 1991) is a Japanese judoka.

She is the gold medallist of the 2017 Judo Grand Prix Hohhot in the -70 kg category.

References

External links
 

1991 births
Living people
Japanese female judoka
21st-century Japanese women